Donghua may refer to:

 Chinese animation
 DHC Software, a Chinese company
 East China (东华)
 Donghua University, a Chinese public university based in Shanghai
 National Dong Hwa University, a public university based in Taiwan, in which Dong Hwa is the alternative romanization of Donghua

See also
 Tung Wah (disambiguation)